Jean-Claude Viollet (born 9 June 1951 in Ruelle-sur-Touvre, Charente) is a former member of the National Assembly of France.  He represented the Charente department,  from 1997 to 2012 and was a member of the Socialiste, radical, citoyen et divers gauche.

References

1951 births
Living people
People from Charente
Socialist Party (France) politicians
Deputies of the 12th National Assembly of the French Fifth Republic
Deputies of the 13th National Assembly of the French Fifth Republic